Leonard Finlan "Pete" Bahan (February 18, 1898 – May 1, 1977) was an American football player.

Bahan played quarterback for Somerset High School in Somerset, Kentucky, and later was the team captain for both the football team and the basketball team at Notre Dame.  He was the starting quarterback and team captain for the undefeated football team in 1919, which later was selected as national co-champions by the National Championship Foundation.  In 1920, he enrolled at Detroit University and started for their football team at right halfback.

Bahan played for one season in the National Football League in 1923, first with the Buffalo All-Americans and then with the Cleveland Indians.

References

External links

1898 births
1977 deaths
American football halfbacks
American football quarterbacks
Buffalo All-Americans players
Cleveland Indians (NFL 1923) players
Detroit Titans football players
Notre Dame Fighting Irish football players
Notre Dame Fighting Irish men's basketball players
People from McKean County, Pennsylvania
People from Somerset, Kentucky
Players of American football from Kentucky
American men's basketball players